The 1903 German football championship was the first tournament sanctioned by the German Football Association (DFB) to crown a national champion. At the time, the newly founded DFB only had about 150 member clubs in 30 mostly local associations. Every champion of these associations was eligible for play in the championship. Additionally, associations from outside Germany were allowed to take part, such as the Prague association that sent her champion to Germany.

Although thirty teams would have been eligible, only six eventually entered the competition.

VfB Leipzig became the first club to be awarded the Viktoria, the trophy for the German champions from 1903 to 1944. The trophy later disappeared during the final stages of the Second World War, did not resurface until after the German reunification and was put on display at the DFB headquarters in Frankfurt until 2015, when it was moved to the new Deutsches Fußballmuseum in Dortmund.

Qualified teams
The qualified teams:

Competition

Quarter-finals

The German Football Association had scheduled the match to be played in Munich, but Prag lodged an official complaint as they would receive greater revenue if the match was played in Prague, while Karlsruhe  protested against travelling Prague. Due to time constraints, the match was scratched and both teams entered the semifinals.

Semi-finals

The match had been scheduled to be held in Leipzig, but Karlsruhe received a telegram, supposedly sent by the German Football Association, informing them that the match had been postponed. The team never went to Leipzig, and was subsequently disqualified.

Final

References

German football championship seasons
1
German